Eduard Fyodorovich Sibiryakov (27 November 1941 – 14 January 2004) was a Russian former volleyball player who competed for the Soviet Union in the 1964 Summer Olympics and in the 1968 Summer Olympics.

He was born in Chelyabinsk and died in Moscow.

In 1964, he was part of the Soviet team which won the gold medal in the Olympic tournament. He played two matches.

Four years later, in 1968, he won his second gold medal with the Soviet team in the 1968 Olympic tournament. He played all nine matches.

External links
 

1941 births
2004 deaths
Russian men's volleyball players
Soviet men's volleyball players
Olympic volleyball players of the Soviet Union
Volleyball players at the 1964 Summer Olympics
Volleyball players at the 1968 Summer Olympics
Olympic gold medalists for the Soviet Union
Sportspeople from Chelyabinsk
Olympic medalists in volleyball
Medalists at the 1968 Summer Olympics
Medalists at the 1964 Summer Olympics
K. D. Ushinsky South Ukrainian National Pedagogical University alumni